The 2014 VFW Sport Clips Help a Hero 200 was the seventh stock car race of the 2014 NASCAR Nationwide Series season, and the 32nd iteration of the event. The race was held on Friday, April 11, 2014, in Darlington, South Carolina, at Darlington Raceway, a  permanent egg-shaped oval racetrack. The race took the scheduled 147 laps to complete. On the final restart with two to go, Chase Elliott, rookie for JR Motorsports, would manage to charge from sixth to first, passing for the lead on the final turn to win his second career NASCAR Nationwide Series victory and his second win of the season. To fill out the podium, Elliott Sadler and Matt Kenseth, both driving for Joe Gibbs Racing, would finish second and third, respectively.

Background 

The race was held at Darlington Raceway, which is a race track built for NASCAR racing located in Darlington, South Carolina. It is nicknamed "The Lady in Black" and "The Track Too Tough to Tame" by many NASCAR fans and drivers and advertised as "A NASCAR Tradition." It is of a unique, somewhat egg-shaped design, an oval with the ends of very different configurations, a condition which supposedly arose from the proximity of one end of the track to a minnow pond the owner refused to relocate. This situation makes it very challenging for the crews to set up their cars' handling in a way that will be effective at both ends.

Entry list 

 (R) denotes rookie driver.
 (i) denotes driver who is ineligible for series driver points.

Practice

First practice 
The first practice session was held on Thursday, April 10, at 1:00 PM EST. The session lasted for one hour.

Final practice 
The final practice session, sometimes referred to as Happy Hour, was held on Thursday, April 10, at 2:30 PM EST. The session lasted for one hour and 30 minutes.

Qualifying 
Qualifying was held on Friday, April 11, at 4:10 PM EST. Since Darlington Raceway is at least  in length, the qualifying system was a multi-car system that included three rounds. The first round was 25 minutes, where every driver would be able to set a lap within the 25 minutes. Then, the second round would consist of the fastest 24 cars in Round 1, and drivers would have 10 minutes to set a lap. Round 3 consisted of the fastest 12 drivers from Round 2, and the drivers would have 5 minutes to set a time. Whoever was fastest in Round 3 would win the pole.

No drivers would fail to qualify.

Full qualifying results 

*Time not available.

Race results

Standings after the race 

Drivers' Championship standings

Note: Only the first 10 positions are included for the driver standings.

References 

2014 NASCAR Nationwide Series
NASCAR races at Darlington Raceway
April 2014 sports events in the United States
2014 in sports in South Carolina